Jason Mark Everman (born October 16, 1967) is an American musician and soldier who played guitar with Nirvana and Mind Funk, and bass in Soundgarden and OLD. He later served tours in both Iraq and Afghanistan with the U.S. Army as an Army Ranger and Green Beret. As of May 2017, Everman plays the guitar in a military veteran band called Silence and Light.

Early life
In a 2013 interview with The New York Times Magazine, Everman said when asked about his birthplace, "My birth certificate says Kodiak, but I'm pretty sure it was Ouzinkie, where my parents lived in a two-room cabin with a pet ocelot named Kia." His parents had moved to the remote Spruce Island to, as guitarist and writer Clay Tarver put it, "get back to nature", but their marriage did not "work out". His mother left with Jason when he was a toddler, moved to Washington, and remarried to a former Navy serviceman; the family eventually settled in Poulsbo, across Puget Sound from Seattle.

According to Everman's half-sister, with whom he grew up, "My mother was extremely depressed, an artistic genius who was also a pill-popping alcoholic. Jason and I learned to walk on eggshells and really learned to take care of ourselves." After an incident in which he and a friend blew up a toilet with an M-80 firecracker, his grandmother put him in therapy sessions to deal with his emotional issues. Everman began playing guitar during the therapy sessions; he initially picked up one of the guitars the therapist kept around his office, and the therapist then decided to play with him, hoping it would help him open up. He went on to play in several bands during his high school years. Also, he reestablished contact with his biological father, who by that time owned a fishing boat in Alaska, and worked several seasons on the boat. Prior to joining with Nirvana, he played guitar in a local band called Stonecrow with future Nirvana drummer Chad Channing.

Early musical career
Everman joined Nirvana in February 1989 as a second guitarist. He is listed as being second guitarist on Nirvana's Bleach and appears on the cover, but did not actually play on any of the tracks. Nirvana founder Kurt Cobain said the credit was a token of thanks to Everman for paying a fee of $606.17 to record the album. On the 2009 remastered edition of Bleach, Everman is no longer credited but can still be seen on the front cover and he is given special thanks in the booklet.

Everman toured with Nirvana the summer of 1989 in support of Bleach. He can be heard playing guitar on Trust No-One, an unofficial release of a live performance in Boston. Cobain had broken his guitar the previous night and only provided vocals, leaving the guitar playing to Everman. Everman can also be seen in the bootleg video of Nirvana playing an "in store" performance at Rhino Records in Los Angeles on June 23, 1989. During his time with Nirvana, he could sometimes be seen using Fender guitars, generally the Fender Telecaster. Nirvana fired Everman after the tour ended due to his moodiness.

A two-song Nirvana session featuring Everman on guitar is available, albeit in separate releases. A Kiss cover called "Do You Love Me?" was released on the 1990 tribute album Hard to Believe: A Kiss Covers Compilation,  and "Dive" was released on 2004's With the Lights Out. Both tracks were recorded at The Evergreen State College's 24-track studio in June 1989.

Everman next joined Soundgarden in Fall of 1989 as Hiro Yamamoto's temporary successor on bass. In April of that year, he played on the band's cover of The Beatles' "Come Together", which appeared on an EP called Loudest Love. Everman appeared in Soundgarden's Louder Than Live home video. Everman left immediately after Soundgarden completed its promotional tour for Louder Than Love in mid-1990 to play bass for the band OLD (Old Lady Drivers) and Soundgarden found Yamamoto's ultimate successor, bassist Ben Shepherd. Later, in 1993, he played guitar in Mind Funk.

Later life
In September 1994, influenced by Renaissance icon Benvenuto Cellini (who stated that a well-rounded man is an artist, warrior and philosopher), he left Mind Funk to join the United States Army, subsequently serving with the Army's 2nd Ranger Battalion and later with the Special Forces, serving tours in Afghanistan and Iraq. After completing his service, he took a break from the military and lived in New York City where he briefly worked as a bike messenger. He then traveled to Tibet and worked and studied in a Buddhist monastery before returning to the U.S. He reentered the Army when offered the chance to join Special Forces.

After receiving an honorable discharge in 2006, Everman went on to earn a Bachelor of Arts in philosophy from Columbia University School of General Studies on May 20, 2013. General Stanley A. McChrystal wrote a letter of recommendation for his application. In September 2010, Everman conducted an interview with Music Life Radio detailing his life. He also briefly appears in a 2010 documentary on Motörhead frontman Lemmy where he described Motorhead as "Good go-to-war music."

In July 2013, The New York Times published a portrait on Everman, written by guitarist and writer Clay Tarver. The article features interviews with Everman, his family members, former band colleagues, music industry people, and soldiers. A 2014 The Daily Beast interview mentions that Everman was invited to attend Nirvana's Rock and Roll Hall of Fame induction, that he lives in New York, has participated in writing workshops and "still goes overseas regularly, working as a consultant for the military."

According to his biography on the homepage for The Pat Tillman Foundation, of which he is a member, Everman is currently pursuing a Master's in Military History from Norwich University.

In May 2017 Everman met fellow veteran Brad Thomas in New York and the two decided to start a band. By July the band, named Silence & Light, had a complete lineup consisting of military veterans with Everman playing the guitar. They began recording an album in January 2019 in Van Nuys California. One song was released in October 2019 and the complete album was released in December 2019. The band's profits are dedicated to helping members of the Special Operations Community, the Military, and First Responders. The band says they consider their genre to be modern rock.

Discography
With Mind Funk
 Dropped (1993)

With Nirvana
 Bleach (1989) (Credited but does not play.)
 Hard to Believe: Kiss Covers Compilation (1990)
 With the Lights Out (2004)

With OLD
 Lo Flux Tube (1991)
 Masters of Misery – Black Sabbath: An Earache Tribute (1992)

With Soundgarden
 Loudest Love (1990)
 Louder Than Live (1990)

With Silence and Light
 Volume One (2019)

Awards and decorations
Everman's awards include the following:

See also
List of pre-fame band departures
Terry Reid

References

External links
 
 

1967 births
20th-century American guitarists
Alternative metal guitarists
Alternative rock bass guitarists
Alternative rock guitarists
American alternative rock musicians
American male guitarists
United States Army personnel of the Iraq War
United States Army personnel of the War in Afghanistan (2001–2021)
American rock bass guitarists
American male bass guitarists
American rock guitarists
Columbia University School of General Studies alumni
Guitarists from Alaska
Guitarists from Washington (state)
Grunge musicians
Living people
Members of the United States Army Special Forces
Mind Funk members
Nirvana (band) members
People from Poulsbo, Washington
People from Kodiak Island Borough, Alaska
Soundgarden members
Sub Pop artists
United States Army Rangers
United States Army soldiers
OLD (band) members